Nicolás Fernando Cordero (born 11 April 1999) is an Argentine professional footballer who plays as a forward for Huracán.

Club career
Cordero's career began with Huracán. He first appeared in the club's first-team squad in July 2016, when manager Eduardo Domínguez selected as a substitute for a Copa Argentina encounter with Central Córdoba. In August 2018, Cordero made his senior debut during a round of thirty-two cup tie with fellow Argentine Primera División team Atlético Tucumán; he was subbed on for Diego Mendoza with nine minutes remaining.

On 2 July 2021, Cordero joined Unión de Santa Fe on a loan deal until the end of 2022 with a purchase option. However, due to lack of playing time, Unión confirmed at the end of January 2022, that the spell had been cut short and Cordero would return to Huracán. During his stay at Unión, he played 14 games, in which 9 were as a starter, converting two goals: one against Godoy Cruz, and the following date, a penalty kick on April 15 against Argentinos Juniors.

International career
Cordero received a training call-up to the Argentina U19 squad in February 2018.

Career statistics
.

References

External links

1999 births
Living people
Footballers from Buenos Aires
Argentine footballers
Association football forwards
Argentine Primera División players
Club Atlético Huracán footballers
Unión de Santa Fe footballers